Berthe de Rohan (21 May 1868 – 19 January 1945) was a Princess of Rohan and member of the House of Rohan by birth. She was born in Teplitz, Kingdom of Bohemia, Austria-Hungary. Through her marriage to Carlist claimant to the Spanish throne, Berthe became a member of the House of Bourbon and titular Queen consort of Spain, France, and Navarre.

Early life
Princess Marie-Berthe Françoise Félicie Jeanne was the ninth and youngest child of Prince Arthur of Rohan (1826-1885) (son of Prince Benjamin de Rohan-Rochefort-Guéménée and Princess Stephanie of Croÿ) and his wife, Countess Maria Gabriela of Waldstein-Wartenberg (1827-1890) (daughter of Count Christian Vinzenz Ernst von Waldstein-Wartenberg and Countess Maria Franziska of Thun und Hohenstein).

Marriage
Berthe married Carlos, Duke of Madrid, second son, eldest son of Juan, Count of Montizón and his wife Archduchess Maria Beatrix of Austria-Este, on 28 April 1894 in Prague. After the death of his first wife Princess Margherita of Bourbon-Parma, their union was encouraged by his mother Archduchess Maria Beatrix of Austria-Este (1824–1906) and produced no issue.

Death
Berthe died in relative obscurity in Vienna, Greater German Reich, aged 76.

Ancestry

References

|-

|-

Rohan
Rohan
Rohan
House of Rohan
Rohan
Rohan
Rohan
Rohan